The Italy national under-20 basketball team is the national representative for Italy in international under-20 basketball tournaments. They are administered by the Federazione Italiana Pallacanestro. 

The team competes at the FIBA U20 European Championship.

Competitive record

FIBA U20 European Championship

FIBA U21 World Championship

See also
Italy national basketball team
Italy national under-19 basketball team
Italy national under-17 basketball team

References

External links
Official website 
FIBA profile

Men's national under-20 basketball teams
Basketball